Morethia is a skink genus of the order Squamata, commonly called Morethia skinks  or firetail skinks, found in Australia.

Species
Listed alphabetically by specific name.
Morethia adelaidensis (W. Peters, 1874) – saltbush Morethia skink
Morethia boulengeri (Ogilby, 1890) – Boulenger's skink, south-eastern Morethia skink
Morethia butleri (Storr, 1963) – woodland Morethia skink
Morethia lineoocellata (A.M.C. Duméril & Bibron, 1839) – west coast Morethia skink, western pale-flecked Morethia
Morethia obscura Storr, 1972 – shrubland Morethia skink
Morethia ruficauda (Lucas & C. Frost, 1895) – lined firetail skink
Morethia storri Greer, 1980 – top end firetail skink
Morethia taeniopleura (W. Peters, 1874) – north-eastern firetail skink, fire-tailed skink

Nota bene: A binomial authority in parentheses indicates that the species was originally described in a genus other than Morethia.

References

Further reading
Gray JE (1845). Catalogue of the Specimens of Lizards in the Collection of the British Museum. London: Trustees of the British Museum. (Edward Newman, printer). xxviii + 289 pp. (Morethia, new genus, p. 65).

 
Lizard genera
Taxa named by John Edward Gray
Skinks of Australia